Esoko is an online agricultural marketing and messaging service, based in Accra, Ghana.  The service sends out market data and other information to individuals, agribusiness, government agencies, projects by text messaging, and also gives personalised price alerts, buy and sell offers, bulk text messaging, stock counts and polling via text.

History
Esoko began as TradeNet in 2005 with the encouragement of the Food and Agriculture Organization of the United Nations, and in partnership with FoodNet in Uganda.  Focused on agricultural marketing it provided current market data via text messaging and the web to stakeholders within the agriculture and trade sectors in developing countries.

In 2005 TradeNet signed a three year agreement with USAID's MISTOWA program to adapt the product and make it available to their target beneficiaries (MISTOWA's mission was to increase regional trade in West Africa by 20%).  Esoko was described by The Economist as "a simple sort of eBay for agricultural products across a dozen countries in West Africa".

In April, 2009 TradeNet rebranded as Esoko, switching to a new platform with a broader set of tools. The name Esoko originated from the Swahili name Soko which means market; the 'e' representing 'electronic'.  The eSoko name was also an idea brought from the eRwanda Project in Rwanda where they have a different version of eSoko, owned by the Ministry of Agriculture (www.esoko.gov.rw).  In 2008, the eRwanda Project granted permission to TradeNet to use the name Esoko.

Currently Esoko is active in 16 countries through different partnership agreements; both public sector agricultural projects and Esoko country resellers and franchises.

Investors

Mark Davies (founder), Jim Forster, International Finance Corporation, Soros Economic Development Fund

Working in

Partners

References

Agricultural marketing organizations
Organisations based in Ghana